Several vessels have been named Duke of Buccleugh (or Duke of Buccleuch) for the Duke of Buccleuch:

 was launched at Yarmouth. In 1789 she became a slave ship. She made five complete enslaving voyages before a French privateer captured her in September 1797 after she had delivered her captives from her sixth voyage.
 was an East Indiaman launched in 1788. She made six voyages for the British East India Company (EIC) before she was sold in 1802.
, of 205 tons (bm) was launched at Leith. She mostly traded between Leith and London and was last listed in 1844.
 made one voyage for the EIC and then traded privately between England and India until she was lost in 1840.

See also

Ship names